Thomas Brudenell-Bruce may refer to:

Thomas Brudenell-Bruce, 1st Earl of Ailesbury (1729–1814), British courtier
Thomas Brudenell-Bruce, Viscount Savernake (born 1982), heir apparent's heir apparent

See also
Brudenell-Bruce
Thomas Brudenell (disambiguation)
Thomas Bruce (disambiguation)